Adelphagrotis is a genus of moths of the family Noctuidae.

Species
 Adelphagrotis carissima (Harvey, 1875)
 Adelphagrotis indeterminata (Walker, 1865)
 Adelphagrotis stellaris (Grote, 1880)

References
 Adelphagrotis at Markku Savela's Lepidoptera and some other life forms
Natural History Museum Lepidoptera genus database

Noctuinae
Noctuoidea genera